William Nisbeth Sayles (July 27, 1917 – November 20, 1996) was an American right-handed pitcher in Major League Baseball who played with the Boston Red Sox in the 1939 season, and for the New York Giants and Brooklyn Dodgers in 1943. Born in Portland, Oregon, he also pitched in the 1936 Summer Olympics as part of the "World Champions" team.

Sayles died at age 79 in Lincoln City, Oregon.

References

External links
, or Baseball Almanac

1917 births
1996 deaths
Asheville Tourists managers
Asheville Tourists players
Baseball players at the 1936 Summer Olympics
Baseball players from Portland, Oregon
Brooklyn Dodgers players
Boston Red Sox players
Little Rock Travelers players
Louisville Colonels (minor league) players
Major League Baseball pitchers
New York Giants (NL) players
Oregon Ducks baseball players
Scranton Red Sox players
People from Lincoln City, Oregon